Arthur Charles Lestoc Hylton Stewart (21 March 1884 – 14 November 1932) was an English cathedral organist, who served in Rochester Cathedral and St. George's Chapel, Windsor Castle. He also produced several compositions for organ, and a few for choir.

Background
Arthur Charles Lestoc Hylton Stewart was born on 21 March 1884 in Chester, the son of Charles Henry Hylton Stewart (a minor canon of Chester Cathedral and previously Organist and Master of the Choristers of Chichester Cathedral).

His brother was Bruce Hylton-Stewart.

He was a chorister at Magdalen College, Oxford and organ scholar of Peterhouse, Cambridge.

He was music master at Sedbergh School from 1907 - 1908.

In 1917, he married Gladys Maud Priestley Inglis, the daughter of Charles John Inglis and the granddaughter of Dr. James Inglis.

He died 14 November 1932.

Career

Organist of:
St. Martin's Church, Scarborough 1908 - 1914
Blackburn Parish Church 1914 - 1916
Rochester Cathedral 1916 - 1930
Chester Cathedral 1930 - 1932
St. George's Chapel, Windsor Castle 1932

References

English classical organists
British male organists
Cathedral organists
1884 births
1932 deaths
People from Chester
Alumni of Peterhouse, Cambridge
20th-century organists
20th-century British male musicians
20th-century classical musicians
Male classical organists